Matmut Stadium is a rugby union stadium located in Vénissieux, Lyon, France with a capacity of 11,805, with slightly over 10,000 of those seated. It was the home stadium of Lyon OU and replaced Stade Vuillermet. It opened on 19 November 2011, with a European Challenge Cup game against RC Toulon. It was built in just three months after the club's promotion from the Pro D2 to the Top 14.

References

External links
Lyon OU stadium page

Sports venues in Lyon Metropolis
Rugby union stadiums in France
Buildings and structures in Lyon
Sports venues completed in 2011
21st-century architecture in France